John Francis Lehman Jr. (born September 14, 1942) is an American private equity investor and writer who was secretary of the Navy (1981-1987) during the Reagan administration in which he promoted the creation of a 600-ship navy.

Lehman is on the board of trustees for the thinktank Foreign Policy Research Institute (FPRI). Lehman was also, from 2003 to 2004, a member of the National Commission on Terrorist Attacks Upon the United States, commonly called the 9/11 Commission, and signed policy letters produced by the Project for the New American Century. He was also an advisor to Senator John McCain for the 2008 presidential race, and for Senator Mitt Romney in his 2012 bid.

Education and family
Lehman was born in Philadelphia, Pennsylvania, the son of Constance (Cruice) and John Francis Lehman, an industrial engineer and decorated US Navy veteran (Lieutenant Commander). He graduated from La Salle College High School and received a B.S. in international relations from Saint Joseph's University in 1964, gained a B.A. from Gonville and Caius College, Cambridge (later elevated to an M.A.), and went on to earn an M.A. and Ph.D. from the University of Pennsylvania.

He is a first cousin once removed of Grace Kelly (Princess Grace of Monaco), and is Chairman of the Princess Grace Foundation-USA, a public charity established after Princess Grace's death to support emerging artists in film, dance, and theater. He led the American delegation to the funeral of Prince Rainier. He and his family live in Bucks County, Pennsylvania, and in Manhattan. He is a long-time Republican.

Military career
Lehman was in the U.S. Air Force Reserve for three years in Cambridge and in 1968 left the Air Force Reserve and joined the United States Naval Reserve as an ensign. He later rose to the rank of commander as a naval flight officer on the A-6 Intruder as a bombardier/navigator. He was on the staff of the National Security Council under Henry Kissinger.

In 1977, Lehman founded the Abington Corporation, a consulting company with clients including defense companies such as Northrop Corporation. He remained its president and director until 1981, when he was appointed by Ronald Reagan to be Secretary of the Navy.

Secretary of the Navy (1981–1987)
As the 65th secretary, appointed by [Reagan in 1981, Lehman launched the idea of building a "600-ship navy". He became secretary of the navy at 38, a young age of which he was conscious in his dealing with admirals. He was unique in still being a commander in the Naval Reserve and on active flight status while he was secretary. He developed a strategic concept to counter the threat of Soviet incursion into Western Europe known as the "Lehman Doctrine". The plan called for a military response to any Soviet invasion in Europe by attacking and invading the Soviet Far East along the Pacific, a much less-defended front. Forces would sever the Trans-Siberian Railway and fight westward toward Moscow.

Lehman, a naval aviator, was a massive supporter of carrier power. His works as a lobbyist and author in the 1970s led him naturally to support a resurgence of US navval aviation under Reagan. His support for the 600-ship navy and promotion of the US Maritime Strategy are hallmarks of that, as are his reactivation of the Iowa Class battleships. Both the carriers and the battleships were to announce America's overcoming of recent Soviet potential superiority by taking a war to its doorstep.

According to Hedrick Smith in his book The Power Game, Lehman lost a fight at the Pentagon with the deputy secretary of defense, W. Paul Thayer, over reducing the number of future aircraft carriers planned.

Lehman sided with General Dynamics after it had falsified inspection records to hide welding flaws on submarines and pushed a settlement that paid over 600 million dollars for what Rickover called shoddy work.
Lehman engaged in a sexual act with a stripper in front of 50 to 100 spectators in a hospitality suite at Tailhook in 1986, and had been seen cavorting with strippers at earlier Tailhook conventions.

Lehman resigned in 1987. He was then promoted to the rank of captain in the US Naval Reserve in 1989 and later retired from the US Navy as a reserve officer in that rank after 30 years of service. On October 13, 2020, the US Navy announced that it was naming the next Arleigh Burke class (DDG-137) destroyer after him. The USS John F. Lehman is under construction.

Later career
Lehman was a former investment banker with UBS AG, Paine Webber, and the president of Abington Corporation. , Lehman is chairman of the private equity investment firm J. F. Lehman and Company, as well as chairman of the Hawaii Superferry. Lehman is chairman of the board of OAO Technology Solutions Inc. He is also an honorary member of the First Troop Philadelphia City Cavalry. , he is a member of a number of influential conservative American think tanks, including the Project for the New American Century, The Heritage Foundation, the Foreign Policy Research Institute, the Center for Security Policy and the Committee on the Present Danger.

After his work in the 9/11 Commission in 2002, there was increased speculation that Lehman might be named to a chief security post within the Bush administration. Positions suggested included Director of Central Intelligence, Director of National Intelligence and secretary of defense when Donald Rumsfeld stepped down. During the 2008 presidential election, Lehman was named a possible secretary of defense in the case of a John McCain victory over the winning Democratic nominee, Barack Obama.

He is currently the chairman of the Princess Grace Foundation-USA and is a director of the OpSail Foundation. He is also a member of the board of overseers of the School of Engineering at the University of Pennsylvania, and is a trustee of La Salle College High School. He has been on the board of directors of the Ball Corporation since 1987. Lehman is also an advisory board member for the Partnership for a Secure America, a not-for-profit organization dedicated to recreating the bipartisan center in American national security and foreign policy.

That revelation made headlines in the United Kingdom but, except for the US Naval Institute, not in the United States.

Bibliography

Books
 On Seas of Glory: Heroic Men, Great Ships, and Epic Battles of the American Navy (2002)
 Winner of the 2003 Samuel Eliot Morison Award for Naval Literature
 Making War: The 200-Year-Old Battle Between the President and Congress Over How America Goes to War (Naval Institute Press, 2001) 
 America the Vulnerable: Our Military Problems and How to Fix Them (1992)
 
 "The Executive, Congress, and Foreign Policy: Studies of the Nixon Administration" (New York: Praeger, 1974).
 Command of the Seas: Building the 600 Ship Navy (Naval Institute Press, 2001)
 Winner of the 1989 Samuel Eliot Morison Award for Naval Literature

Critical studies and reviews of Lehman's work
Oceans ventured

References

External links

 Short Biography
 

Alumni of Gonville and Caius College, Cambridge
American investment bankers
American military writers
Living people
Military personnel from Philadelphia
People from Bucks County, Pennsylvania
Politicians from Philadelphia
Reagan administration personnel
Saint Joseph's University alumni
The Heritage Foundation
United States Air Force officers
United States Navy officers
United States Secretaries of the Navy
University of Pennsylvania alumni
Foreign Policy Research Institute
1942 births